Hacı Halil Pasha (Turkish: Hacı Halil Paşa) was an Ottoman Grand vizier. His ephitet Hacı means "pilgrim".

Early years
Hacı Halil Pasha was born in Kemaliye (then known as Eğin) and rose through the Bostancı corps. In 1694, he resigned and went to Baghdad (now in Iraq) as the subordinate of the Baghdad governor. In 1711 he was promoted to the overall command of the Bostancı corps (Bostancıbaşı) and in 1716 to the post of beylerbey the Erzurum Eyalet. However he didn't serve in Erzurum due to the outbreak of the Austro-Turkish War of 1716–18, being reassigned to serve in Belgrade (now in Serbia).

Grand Vizier
During the decisive Battle of Petrovaradin on 5 August 1716, the grand vizier Silahdar Ali Pasha was killed. Upon the suggestion of the commanders, the sultan appointed Halil Pasha as the new grand vizier. Next year he campaigned to aid Belgrade, which was being besieged by the Austrian army. However Eugene of Savoy of Austria defeated Halil Pasha and captured Belgrade.  After this defeat he was dismissed from the post on 26 August 1717.

Later years
Although he was sentenced to death, he hid himself in İstanbul. On 7 June 1720 he was discovered, but with the help of his partisans he was pardoned. In 1727, he became the governor of the Sanjak of Eğriboz in central Greece, and in the next year he was appointed to the governorship of Crete, where he died in 1733.

See also
List of Ottoman Grand Viziers

References

1733 deaths
18th-century Grand Viziers of the Ottoman Empire
Albanian Grand Viziers of the Ottoman Empire
People from the Ottoman Empire of Albanian descent
17th-century births
Ottoman governors of Crete
Austro-Turkish War (1716–1718)
People from Elbasan